Caryn James is an American film critic, journalist, university lecturer and writer.

Biography
She grew up in Providence, Rhode Island and obtained her doctorate in English literature at Brown University. She began working as a freelance journalist at The New York Times, Newsday, TV Guide and Vogue. She finally landed a three-week temporary position at The New York Times Book Review and later became a permanent staff member.

She moved to the daily newspaper, as a cultural reporter. In 1995, she began working as a television critic and in 1997, James was named by the Times'''s as its first chief television critic. A year later, she published her first novel, Glorie, to good reviews.

In 2006, she published her second novel, What Caroline Knew: A Novel, and by 2010, had left the Times, returning to film critiques. She then began working at Marie Claire magazine while also doing freelance work. The following year, James began working with IndieWire in a division created for her James on Screens. She writes for The Wall Street Journal, The Hollywood Reporter'' and is an adjunct professor in film studies at Columbia University.

Selected works

References

External links

Living people
Writers from Providence, Rhode Island
Providence College alumni
Brown University alumni
Columbia University faculty
21st-century American women writers
American women film critics
American film historians
American women novelists
20th-century American novelists
21st-century American non-fiction writers
21st-century American novelists
Year of birth missing (living people)
20th-century American women writers
Women television critics